Mu Cephei (Latinized from μ Cephei, abbreviated Mu Cep or μ Cep), also known as Herschel's Garnet Star, Erakis, or HD 206936, is a red supergiant or hypergiant star in the constellation Cepheus. It appears garnet red and is located at the edge of the IC 1396 nebula.  Since 1943, the spectrum of this star has served as a spectral standard by which other stars are classified.

Mu Cephei is visually nearly 100,000 times brighter than the Sun, with an absolute visual magnitude of −7.6. It is also one of the largest known stars with a radius around or over 1,000 times that of the sun, and were it placed in the Sun's position it would engulf the orbit of Mars and Jupiter.

History

The deep red color of Mu Cephei was noted by William Herschel, who described it as "a very fine deep garnet colour, such as the periodical star ο Ceti". It is thus commonly known as Herschel's "Garnet Star". Mu Cephei was called Garnet sidus by Giuseppe Piazzi in his catalogue. An alternative name, Erakis, used in Antonín Bečvář's star catalogue, is probably due to confusion with Mu Draconis, which was previously called   in Arabic.

In 1848, English astronomer John Russell Hind discovered that Mu Cephei was variable. This variability was quickly confirmed by German astronomer Friedrich Wilhelm Argelander. Almost continual records of the star's variability have been maintained since 1881.

The angular diameter of μ Cephei has been measured interferometrically.
μ Cephei was used as one of the original "dagger stars", those with well-defined spectra that could be used for the classification of other stars, for MK spectral classifications.  In 1943 it was the standard star for M2  Ia, updated in 1980 to be the standard star for the new type M2- Ia.

Distance

The distance to Mu Cephei is not very well known. However, this value is close to the margin of error.

Surroundings
This outer shell appears to contain molecular gases such as CO, H2O, and SiO. Infrared observations suggest the presence of a wide ring of dust and water with an inner radius about twice that of the star itself, extending to about four times the radius of the star.

This indicates an age of about 2,000–3,000 years for the shell. Closer to the star, this material shows a pronounced asymmetry, which may be shaped as a torus.

Variability

Mu Cephei is a variable star and the prototype of the obsolete class of the Mu Cephei variables. It is now considered to be a semiregular variable of type SRc. Its apparent brightness varies erratically between magnitude 3.4 and 5.1.  Many different periods have been reported, but they are consistently near 860 days or 4,400 days.

Properties

A very luminous red supergiant, Mu Cephei is among the largest stars visible to the naked eye, and one of the largest known cool supergiants.

The bolometric luminosity, summed over all wavelengths, is calculated from integrating the spectral energy distribution (SED) to be , making μ Cephei one of the most luminous red supergiants in the Milky Way. Other recent publications give similar effective temperatures.

These parameters are all consistent with those estimated for Betelgeuse.

Supernova
Mu Cephei is nearing death. It has begun to fuse helium into carbon, whereas a main sequence star fuses hydrogen into helium.  When a supergiant star has converted elements in its core to iron, the core collapses to produce a supernova and the star is destroyed, leaving behind a vast gaseous cloud and a small, dense remnant.  For a star as massive as Mu Cephei the remnant is likely to be a black hole.  The most massive red supergiants will evolve back to blue supergiants, Luminous blue variables, or Wolf-Rayet stars before their cores collapse, and Mu Cephei appears to be massive enough for this to happen.  A post-red supergiant will produce a type IIn or type II-b supernova, while a Wolf Rayet star will produce a type Ib or Ic supernova.

Components
There are several faint stars within two arc-minutes of Mu Cephei, and listed in multiple star catalogues.

See also
 List of most massive stars

References

External links
 
 
 
 
 

M-type supergiants
M-type hypergiants
Semiregular variable stars
Runaway stars
Cepheus (constellation)
Cephei, Mu
Durchmusterung objects
206936
107259
8316
Herschel's Garnet Star
Emission-line stars
TIC objects